Sergei Vaht (born 25 February 1979) is an Estonian fencer.  He was born in Belarus.

He began his fencing career in 1988, coached by Viktor Kirpu. He won silver medal at 2001 World Fencing Championships in team épée. He is won medals at Estonian championships. 2001–2008 he was a member of Estonian national fencing team.

References

Living people
1979 births
Estonian male épée fencers
Place of birth missing (living people)